Tifal is an Ok language spoken  in Papua New Guinea. Dialects are (1) Tifal (Tifalmin) and Urap (Urapmin) and (2) Atbal (Atbalmin).

Geography

The Tifal language is bounded by Papuan and Irian Jaya speakers to the south and west, the Telefomin valley in the east, and the Sepik river to the north.

Orthography

Phonology

Consonants

 is realized as  intervocalically, e.g. :  'water container'.
 is  intervocalically,  in syllable coda before consonants, and  elsewhere.
 is realized as  before .
 is alveolar adjacent to back vowels and alveodental elsewhere. One dialect realizes  as  intervocalically.

Vowels

 and  rarely contrast.

Phonotactics
Syllable structure is (C)V()(C). The expression kwiin takan 'oh my!' may be an exception.

 only occurs word-initially.  only occurs syllable-initially.  is always syllable-final.

Initial  only occurs in some dialects. Initial  occurs in two dialects, and may usually be interpreted as C+V.

 and  occur syllable-initially. Only one dialect allows syllable-coda .

Stress
In inflected words stress lies on the last syllable of the verb stem. Otherwise, if there are long vowels stress falls on the first in the word. If all vowels are short, stress falls on the last syllable if it is closed and the first syllable otherwise.

Grammar

Nouns
Nouns are not inflected but may mark possession. Body parts and kinship terms are obligatorily possessed, and some kinship terms require affixing. On other nouns possession is optional, except for proper names which are never possessed.

Pronouns

Verbs
Tifal has a rich aspectual system. Verbs may be separated into four groups based on how they transform from continuative to punctiliar aspect. Some only have vowel and/or simple stem changes, some have suppletive stems, some change compound-final stems, and some which have allomorphs which add -(a)laa-min (or rarely -daa-laa-min) to the stem.

Verbs also can be divided based on transitivity. Some require direct objects, some with optional objects, some with optional locational objects, and a few intransitive verbs.

Tense and aspect
Most final verbs mark tense, mood, and person, but most verbs can mark aspect and not tense and still be a final verb.

 "initial consonant of the customary or class changing marker is retained"

Tifal sentences are contain inflected verb-root-chains, often with a final fully conjugated verb. One must inflect for the amount of time between one verb in the chain and the next.

Deixis
Marking spatial relation between verbs and their objects is obligatory. "up" must be clarified as either "upslope" or "upstream", "down" as "downslope" or "downstream", and "across" as "across land" or "across a river".

Kinship
Tifal has dyadic kinship terms (terms referring to the relationship two or more people have to each other), which are present in less than 10 languages and not prevalent in Papua New Guinea. However, they are a salient feature of the Ok languages. Related terms are found in Oksapmin, Mian, and Telefol.

See also
Urapmin language

References

Bibliography
Boush, Al and Susan Boush. 1974. Tifal phonology. [Manuscript] 40 p. 
Boush, Al. 1975. Tifal grammar essentials. [Manuscript] 75 p. 
Boush, Al. 1979. Aspect on Tifal final and medial verbs. [Manuscript] 23 p. 
Tifal Organised Phonology Data. [Manuscript]

Further reading
Steinkraus, Walter. 1969. 'Tifal phonology showing vowel and tone neutralization.' Kivung 2:1
Healey, Phyllis, and Walter Steinkraus. 1972. 'A Preliminary Vocabulary of Tifal with Grammar Notes.' Language Data Microfiche AP 5, S.I.L., Huntington Beach, v + 117 pp. 
Steinkraus, Walter. 1962–63. Manuscripts. SIL, Ukarumpa.
Boush, Al. 1974–79. Manuscripts. SIL, Ukarumpa.

External links
PNG Language Resources: Tifal
WALS - Tifal
Tifal on globalrecordings.net
Missionary video in Tifal
Tifal Grammar Essentials

Languages of Sandaun Province
Languages of Western Province (Papua New Guinea)
Ok languages